Intégral: The Journal of Applied Musical Thought is a peer-reviewed, online and open-access academic journal specializing in music theory and analysis. It began publication in 1987, under the auspices of graduate students in music theory at the Eastman School of Music. According to its website, "the journal pursues an implicit mandate to explore and exploit the increasing pluralism of the music-theoretic field."

The journal's first editor was John Adrian. It is currently co-edited by Matt Chiu and Derek Myler.

Notes

External links
 

Music theory journals
Contemporary classical music journals
Publications established in 1987